Andrzej Sajkowski (born 21 May 1952) is a former long-distance runner from Poland, who represented his native country at the 1980 Summer Olympics in Moscow, USSR. He competed in the Olympic marathon but did not finish the race. He was born in Warsaw, Mazowieckie. He set his personal best (2:13:38) in the classic distance in 1980.

Achievements
All results regarding marathon, unless stated otherwise

References
 sports-reference

1952 births
Living people
Polish male long-distance runners
Athletes (track and field) at the 1980 Summer Olympics
Olympic athletes of Poland
Athletes from Warsaw